() is a prefecture-level city in western Shaanxi province, People's Republic of China. Since the early 1990s, Baoji has been the second largest city in Shaanxi.

Geography
The built-up (or metro) area made of 3 urban districts had a population of 1,475,962 inhabitants as of the 2020 Chinese census, Fengxiang District not being conurbated yet. Surrounded on three sides by hills, Baoji is in a valley opening out to the east. Its location is strategic, controlling a pass on the Qin Mountains between the Wei River valley and the Jialing River.

History
Thriving early in the Tang dynasty, it has roots to 2000 BC. Today it is a large industrial center. Railways first reached Baoji in 1937 and have been key to its modern growth.

Baoji is considered the gateway between western and eastern China since most trains from Beijing, Shanghai and Xi'an pass through here on their way to Gansu, Sichuan, Xinjiang and Tibet (Lhasa). Famen temple, home to one of Buddha's finger bones, is in Baoji County. The Baoji area was home to the legendary Yandi, one of the Han Chinese forefathers. His tomb is in the southern part of the city and his temple is in the north.

Ancient trackways

Mount Taibai still has some remaining traces of roadways built during the Three Kingdoms Period (220−280 CE) which are all generally unusable due to decay. They remain a popular attraction because they were built by making wood plank bridges along the side of the mountain.

To the South of Baoji lies the beginning of the plank road into the Qin Mountains. There are also several natural sites such as the Jialing Jiang Fountainhead with its small waterfalls and forests.  To the north is Bei Puo, a giant hill made of loess with a panoramic view of the city and a landscape dotted with small farming villages that offer local cuisine.

A number of Longshan archaeological sites have been found north of the Wei River near the North Silk Road.

Baoji Bronze Museum 
Baoji is home to the Baoji Bronze Museum which holds more than 120,000 pieces of cultural relics, primarily of Zhou dynasty descent.

Administrative divisions

Climate

Economy

Industrial Zone
Established in 1992, Baoji Hi-Tech Industrial Development Zone was approved as a national hi-tech zone by State Council. The transportation system around the zone includes Xi'an Xianyang International Airport and National Highway 310. Its encouraged industries are auto parts, electronics, IT, pharmaceutical and bioengineering industry and new materials.

Military
Baoji is the headquarters of the 21st Group Army of the People's Liberation Army, one of the two group armies that comprise the Lanzhou Military Region responsible for defending China's northwest borders.

Transportation
The G85 Yinchuan-Kunming Expressway, China National Highway 310, and G30 Lianyungang-Khorgas Expressway are major highways that run through Baoji.

The city is serviced by the Baoji South on the Xi'an-Baoji and Baoji-Lanzhou sections of the Xuzhou-Xinjiang high speed railway. The Longhai, Baocheng and Baozhong railways also call at Baoji railway station.

A metro system is in the planning stages.

Education

College
 Baoji University of Arts and Sciences
 Baoji Vocational & Technical school

High school
 Baoji middle school

Sister city

Japan
 Yawata, Kyoto Prefecture
 Kitakata, Fukushima
 Gifu, Gifu Prefecture

Other countries
 Belfort, Bourgogne-Franche-Comté region, France
 Beirut, Lebanon

See also
List of twin towns and sister cities in China

References

External links 
 Baoji City Government Website

 
Cities in Shaanxi
National Forest Cities in China